The 2005–06 season was the 103rd competitive season in Belgian football.

Overview
For the first season since 2000, the football fancard is not needed to see a first division game.  Tickets for matches can now be purchased with a single ID card and on the day of the match, which was not permitted since the introduction of the fancard.  Furthermore, for the second season in history (the first time was in the 1960s), one game of each matchday is shown on public television.  Another premiere is that every Jupiler League game can be watched on a private television channel.

Honours

Events
July 30, 2005 - Club Brugge claim the first silverware of the season when they beat Germinal Beerschot 1-1 (4-2 on penalties) to win the Supercup.
September 22, 2005 - Germinal Beerschot coach Marc Brys is sacked after having collected 4 points in 7 matches.  He is replaced by Jos Daerden.
September 29, 2005 - The two Belgian clubs playing the UEFA Cup (Genk and Germinal Beerschot) are defeated in the first round.
October 3, 2005 - AA Louviéroise coach Emilio Ferrera is sacked due to the poor debut of his team (4 points in 9 matches).
October 20, 2005 - Gilbert Bodart is confirmed as the new AA Louviéroise coach.
November 2, 2005 - Paul Put is sacked as manager of Lierse SK because of a lack of results (8 points in 11 matches).
November 7, 2005 - René Trost replaces Paul Put at the helm of Lierse SK.
November 22, 2005 - Gil Vandenbrouck replaces Geert Brouckaert as caretaker of Mouscron.
December 12, 2005 - the Serbian coach Slavoljub Muslin of KSC Lokeren OV signs a contract with Lokomotiv Moskva starting on January 1, 2006.
December 23, 2005 - Aimé Anthuenis replaces Muslin at the helm of KSC Lokeren OV.
January 9, 2006 - Mouscron chooses Paul Put as a new coach.
February 5, 2006 - the match-fixing scandal starts with the Flemish TV programme Panorama.
February 9, 2006 - coach Herman Vermeulen is fired by Sint-Truidense VV after the cup defeat to Charleroi in the quarter finals and a poor 18 points in 21 matches in the championship.  He is replaced two days later by Thomas Caers.
February 14, 2006 - As the main coach Aimé Anthuenis suffers from chest pains, he is replaced by coaches Rudy Cossey and Wlodek Lubanski.
February 17, 2006 - Paul Put is sacked by Mouscron for being involved in the match-fixing scandal, and is replaced by Gil Vandenbrouck.  Former Lierse players Marius Mitu and Laurent Delorge are fired by their club Anderlecht for the same reason.
February 21, 2006 - Gilbert Bodart resigns as AA Louviéroise coach as he is cited as a potential actor in the match-fixing scandal.  He is replaced by Frédéric Tilmant.
February 23, 2006 - Club Brugge is eliminated from the UEFA Cup after a double 2–1 defeat to AS Roma.  It was the last Belgian club competing in a European cup.
February 27, 2006 - The former Belgium coach Aimé Anthuenis stops his coaching career for medical reasons.
April 3, 2006 - Jan Ceulemans is sacked as Club Brugge manager and is replaced by Emilio Ferrera.
April 24, 2006 - Gent player Mbark Boussoufa receives the Belgian Ebony Shoe.
May 5, 2006 - Anderlecht finally wins the Jupiler League on the last matchday with a 3–0 victory against Zulte-Waregem.  Lierse finished 17th and is qualified for the second division final round.
May 7, 2006 - Mons wins the second division thanks to the defeat of leader KVSK United to Oud-Heverlee Leuven. Mbark Boussoufa wins the professional footballer of the year award.

National team
Belgium continued their qualifying campaign for the Football World Cup 2006 but did not qualify.

* Belgium score given first 
** Match stopped after 65 minutes because of bad weather

Key
 H = Home match
 A = Away match
 F = Friendly
 WCQ = FIFA World Cup 2006 Qualifying, European Zone Group 7
 o.g. = own goal

European Qualification

Final league tables

First division

See also
 Belgian First Division 2005-06
 2005–06 Belgian Cup
 2005 Belgian Super Cup
 Belgian Second Division
 Belgian Third Division: divisions A and B
 Belgian Promotion: divisions A, B, C and D

 
Belgium
Seasons in Belgian football
Football
Football